Lawrence C. "Pops" Harrison (August 29, 1906 – August 19. 1967) was an American basketball coach and administrator. He was the head coach of the Iowa Hawkeyes from 1942 to 1950.

Harrison was born and raised in Iowa City, Iowa and played basketball at the University of Iowa, graduating in 1928. Harrison spent a year as athletic director and head coach at Westminster College in New Wilmington, Pennsylvania before resigning in a surprise move at the end of a basketball season where he had led the Titans to a 13–1 record. He then moved to his alma mater as an assistant to head coach Rollie Williams.

In 1942 Williams was called to Navy service and Harrison was elevated to the head coach position. He would be the Hawkeyes' coach for eight seasons, compiling a record of 98–42. His 1944–45 team went 17–1 behind All-Americans Dick Ives and Herb Wilkinson and won the Big Ten Conference title. In the 1949–50 season, Harrison suffered kidney stones and missed several games in the season.  At the close of the season, Harrison was fired from his post as the University cited a failure to perform his job duties.  

Upon leaving the Hawkeyes, Harrison was named general manager of the professional Waterloo Hawks for their final season. After the Hawks folded, Harrison was hired in 1952 as head basketball coach and assistant football coach at Iowa Wesleyan, roles that he maintained for a school year. Harrison led the basketball Tigers to a 16–5 record for the 1952–53 season.

Harrison died on August 19, 1967 at age 60.

References

External links
NCAA Division I coaching record
Iowa Hawkeyes HOF profile

1906 births
1967 deaths
American men's basketball coaches
American men's basketball players
Basketball coaches from Iowa
Basketball players from Iowa
College men's basketball head coaches in the United States
Iowa Hawkeyes men's basketball coaches
Iowa Hawkeyes men's basketball players
Iowa Wesleyan Tigers football coaches
Iowa Wesleyan Tigers men's basketball coaches
Sportspeople from Iowa City, Iowa
Westminster Titans athletic directors
Westminster Titans men's basketball coaches